General elections were held in Guatemala on 7 March 1982. Ángel Aníbal Guevara, hand-picked successor of previous president Romeo Lucas García, was declared the winner of the presidential election and was scheduled to take office on 1 July. However, the elections were widely denounced as fraudulent by elements on both sides of the political spectrum and an army-led coup d'état on 23 March instead installed the three-man junta of General Efraín Ríos Montt, General Horacio Maldonado Schaad, and Colonel Francisco Luis Gordillo Martínez.

Voter turnout was 45.83% in the presidential election.

Results

President
Ángel Aníbal Guevara was the candidate of the Popular Democratic Front, an alliance of the Institutional Democratic Party, the Revolutionary Party and the National Unity Front. Alejandro Maldonado Aguirre was the candidate of the National Opposition Union, an alliance of Guatemalan Christian Democracy and the National Renewal Party.

Congress
Of the nine seats won by the National Opposition Union, seven were taken by Guatemalan Christian Democracy and two by the National Renewal Party.

References

Bibliography
Villagrán Kramer, Francisco. Biografía política de Guatemala: años de guerra y años de paz. FLACSO-Guatemala, 2004.
Political handbook of the world 1982. New York, 1983.

Elections in Guatemala
1982 in Guatemala
Guatemala
Presidential elections in Guatemala
Annulled elections
Election and referendum articles with incomplete results